The Act against Blasphemy 1695 was an Act of the Parliament of Scotland (1695 c.11), passed on 28 June 1695.

The Act reaffirmed the earlier Act against the crime of Blasphemy 1661 and was brought into use in a campaign in 1696 against those regarded as promoting Deism or Atheism. Both Acts were specified in the indictment which led to the execution of Thomas Aikenhead.

The Act was repealed in 1813 under the Unitarian Relief Act.

References

1695 in law
1695 in Scotland
Acts of the Parliament of Scotland
Law about religion in the United Kingdom
Church of Scotland